is a Japanese badminton player. She won a bronze medal in 2015 BWF World Championships in Jakarta with Naoko Fukuman.

Achievements

BWF World Championships 
Women's doubles

Asian Championships 
Women's doubles

BWF Superseries 
The BWF Superseries, which was launched on 14 December 2006 and implemented in 2007, was a series of elite badminton tournaments, sanctioned by the Badminton World Federation (BWF). BWF Superseries levels were Superseries and Superseries Premier. A season of Superseries consisted of twelve tournaments around the world that had been introduced since 2011. Successful players were invited to the Superseries Finals, which were held at the end of each year.

Women's doubles

  BWF Superseries Finals tournament
  BWF Superseries Premier tournament
  BWF Superseries tournament

BWF Grand Prix 
The BWF Grand Prix had two levels, the Grand Prix and Grand Prix Gold. It was a series of badminton tournaments sanctioned by the Badminton World Federation (BWF) and played between 2007 and 2017.

Women's doubles

  BWF Grand Prix Gold tournament
  BWF Grand Prix tournament

BWF International Challenge/Series 
Women's doubles

  BWF International Challenge tournament
  BWF International Series tournament

References

External links 
 

1992 births
Living people
People from Toyoake, Aichi
Sportspeople from Aichi Prefecture
Japanese female badminton players